Anacampseros albissima  is a species of succulent plant native to the Karoo desert of South Africa. Its common name in Afrikaans, skilpadkos, means 'tortoise food'.

References 

Anacampseros